Ringerike Hospital is a hospital which deals with patients from the Buskerud area, especially around Hønefoss. The hospital is part of Vestre Viken Hospital Trust of Southern and Eastern Norway Regional Health Authority. It is the main hospital for around 75,000 people, with capacity for 872 in-patients. It covers the districts of Ringerike and Hole, the municipalities of Jevnaker and Sør-Aurdal, as well as parts of Hallingdal and Valdres. Included in its remit as hospital of Hønefoss, is the smaller clinic of Hallingdal Hospital at Ål. Ringerike Hospital deals with somatics and psychiatry, and in 2005 dealt with around 11,200 patients in surgery, internal medicine, psychiatry, birth and gynecology and paediatrics. In the same year, there were around 62,300 polyclinic consultations. Until 2009 the hospital was its own health trust, Ringerike Hospital Trust.

The helipad measures .

References

External links
 Official website

Hospitals in Norway
Defunct health trusts of Norway
Heliports in Norway
Airports in Viken
Organisations based in Ringerike (municipality)
Buskerud County Municipality